Yvonne Baldeo is an English former professional footballer. She played for A.C.F. Milan and Millwall Lionesses L.F.C.. In 1984 Baldeo scored two goals in Women's FA Cup final in a 4–2 victory for Howbury Grange. Baldeo also scored the winning goal in the 1991 Women's FA cup final.

Honours
Howbury Grange
 FA Women's Cup: 1984

Millwall Lionesses
 FA Women's Cup: 1991

References

Millwall Lionesses L.F.C. players
ACF Milan players
Serie A (women's football) players
Women's association football midfielders
Expatriate women's footballers in Italy
English expatriate sportspeople in Italy
English expatriate footballers
English women's footballers